Roosevelt College Quirino is a defunct college founded in 1953 in Quezon City, Philippines. Its former name was Roosevelt Memorial High School.  The college closed in 2007.

Notable alumni

 Francisco Tatad - former Senator
 Ireneo V. Incha - former Post Master General 
 Mario Parial - National Artist

External links
Official website
Batch 1998 Website

Defunct universities and colleges in the Philippines